This is a partial list of molecules that contain at least 50 carbon atoms.

C50–C52

C53–C55

C56–C59

C60–C62

C63–C66

C67–C69

C70–C79

C80–C89

C90–C100

C>100

See also
 Carbon number

C50